Owiti is a surname but can as well be someone's from first name. Notable people with the surname include:

Jefari Owiti (born 1998), Kenyan footballer
John Owiti (born 1942), Kenyan sprinter
Joshua Owiti (born 1959), Kenyan bishop
Owiti Owayo (born 1992), Kenyan Politician & Author 

Surnames of Kenyan origin